Libchavy is a municipality in Ústí nad Orlicí District in the Pardubice Region of the Czech Republic. It has about 1,800 inhabitants.

Administrative parts
Libchavy consists of two villages; Dolní Libchavy and Horní Libchavy.

Economy
Since 1991, Libchavy is home to a major manufacturer of buses SOR Libchavy.

References

Villages in Ústí nad Orlicí District